Joel G. Block is an American business executive and professional speaker specializing on the topics of real estate, finance, and sales. He also assists attorneys in complex litigation cases involving real estate, securities and alternative investments. Block's roles involve consultation, litigation strategy and expert testimony.

Block has been cited in media and press outlets including Entrepreneur, the Los Angeles Times, Wall Street Journal, Forbes Small Business, San Fernando Valley Business Journal, Investor's Business Daily, Los Angeles Business Journal, and the San Antonio Business Journal.

Block was involved with the iLearning Global, a Brian Tracy organization, as an adult education program faculty member. This elite group was set up for the Top 50 Business Success trainers internationally.

He holds licenses in accounting, real estate, and insurance. In the community, Block is the founder and chairman of the National Association of Syndicators and serves as chairman of the board for the Los Angeles Boys & Girls Club.

Career
Joel G. Block started his career as a tax practitioner and CPA at Price Waterhouse. In 1990, he created Financial Fax, a media publishing company, where he served as CEO and president before it was acquired by the Los Angeles Times in 1995.

From 1996 to 1997, Block served as president and publisher (later becoming a partner) of a sports publishing company in Dallas. He grew this turn-around into the largest fan-based fax publication of its kind in the United States and sold his interest in 1998. From 1998 through 2000, Block served as CEO of two different companies, one in technology and the other in electronic publishing.

In 2001, Block founded Growth-Logic, Inc., a management consultancy company. He also served as chief executive of Sharefax Corp., a business development firm. In 2009, he formed Bullseye Capital, which serves as the real estate syndication arm of Growth-Logic, Inc. It primarily exists as a management company to support the Bullseye Capital Real Property Opportunity Fund, LLC, a real estate private equity initiative set up to acquire distressed commercial and multi-family assets nationwide. Block is the CEO and Managing Director, overseeing 15 Principals, each with a managing interest in the Fund.

References

External links
 Joel G. Block Official site
 Bullseye Capital Official site

1961 births
Living people
21st-century American businesspeople
California State University, Northridge alumni